Cyrtodactylus sonlaensis is a species of gecko that is endemic to northwestern Vietnam.

References 

Cyrtodactylus
Reptiles described in 2017